"I Can't Help It" is a song written by Barry Gibb and performed by English musician Andy Gibb and British-Australian singer Olivia Newton-John. The song appeared on his album, After Dark (1980). The song was produced by Albhy Galuten, Barry Gibb, and Karl Richardson.

Charts

Popular culture
In 1984, Gibb performed this song on the sitcom Punky Brewster in the episode "Play It Again, Punky" where Gibb guest starred as Punky's piano teacher.

References

1979 songs
1980 singles
Andy Gibb songs
Olivia Newton-John songs
Songs written by Barry Gibb
Song recordings produced by Barry Gibb
Song recordings produced by Albhy Galuten
Male–female vocal duets
RSO Records singles
British soft rock songs